Arun Prasad is an historian specialised in the history of karnataka, a comics archivist and a pannapictagraphist (comics collector). He is also a researcher, freelance writer and columnist on the heritage of Bangalore
 and presently the Project & Research Head of Discover Bengaluru, an organisation documenting the Bangalore city's heritage and history.

His comics collection includes more than 17,000 rare and old Indian/Western comics including rarest of Amar Chitra Katha, Indrajal Comics, Tinkle, Mandrake the Magician and The Phantom.
He also possesses the complete collection of Indrajal Comics (published by Bennett, Coleman).

Awards and recognition

 He was described and called as "one of India's most serious comic collectors" and "India's comic king" by the Mid-Day Magazine in December 2013. 
 In August 2014 he was one of the featured collectors on The Great India Collectors Ride (History Channel).
 He won Indian Comics Fandom Award 2014 for Best Comics Collector in November 2014.
 One of the featured Pannapictagraphists (December 2014 - February 2015) in daily e-paper World Comics & Graphic Novels News(WCGNN) published by Freelance talents.

References 

Writers from Bangalore
Indian columnists
Comic book collecting
Living people
Year of birth missing (living people)